Archanara is a genus of moths of the family Noctuidae.

Species
 Archanara aerata (Butler, 1878)
 Archanara affinis Rothschild, 1920
 Archanara cervina Warren, 1911
 Archanara dissoluta – brown-veined wainscot (Treitschke, 1825)
 Archanara geminipuncta Haworth, 1809
 Archanara gigantea Osthelder, 1935
 Archanara insoluta Warren, 1911
 Archanara neurica (Hübner, [1808])
 Archanara phragmiticola (Staudinger, 1892)
 Archanara polita (Walker, 1865)
 Archanara punctilinea Wileman, 1912
 Archanara punctivena Wileman, 1914
 Archanara resoluta Hampson, 1910
 Archanara staettermayeri Schawerda, 1934
 Archanara striata Wileman & South, 1916

Former species
The following species have been transferred via genus Capsula to the genus Globia:
 Globia alameda (Smith, 1903)
 Globia algae Esper, 1789
 Globia laeta Morrison, 1875
 Globia oblonga Grote, 1882
 Globia sparganii Esper, 1790
 Globia subflava Grote, 1882

References
 Archanara at Markku Savela's Lepidoptera and Some Other Life Forms
 Natural History Museum Lepidoptera genus database

Acronictinae